Sophia University (Japanese: 上智大学, Jōchi Daigaku; Latin: Universitas Sedis Sapientiae) is a private research university in Japan. Sophia is one of the three Sōkeijōchi (早慶上智) private universities, a group of the top three private universities in Japan with the other two being Keio University and Waseda University, according to the Times Higher Education. It is also ranked number 18 in the 2021 Times Japan University Rankings. Founded by the Roman Catholic religious order of the Society of Jesus in 1913, the university has grown from its three original academic departments of Philosophy, German Literature, and Commerce to 9 undergraduate Faculties and 10 Graduate Schools, with over 13,900 students in total at the moment.

Sophia has international students from 77 countries and it has forged agreements with 395 overseas universities in 81 countries to encourage students joining the exchange programs with several other top universities throughout the world.

Sophia is a leading institution in globalisation, foreign languages, and literature in Japan. As a prominent institution for research and higher learning in the fields of the social sciences, humanities, and natural sciences, the university has been selected by the Japanese Ministry of Education to be one of 37 universities to receive funding for its internationalisation efforts through the "Top Global University Project". The university has been ranked as the top third Catholic university in Asia

Before 1957, the university only admitted male students to degree programmes, but the numbers of male and female students are now more or less equal. Sophia's alumni are referred to as "Sophians", among whom include the 79th Prime Minister of Japan, Morihiro Hosokawa, several politicians represented in the Japanese National Diet, professors at various higher education institutions, and even actors and musicians in the Japanese film and music industries.

Origins of the university name 
The name of the university is traced to letters of correspondence between two of the three founders of what would become Sophia University, Fr. James Rockliff, SJ and Fr. Hermann Hoffmann, SJ. The Japanese term 上智 ("higher wisdom" or "supreme wisdom", Jōchi) was the equivalent of the Latin word sapientia, which means wisdom. According to Catholic Church tradition, the term sapientia refers to the one of the Church's devotional titles for the Blessed Virgin Mary, the Seat of Wisdom.

When Joseph Eylenbosch, SJ began teaching Greek at the university in April 1924, he thought that the Japanese term jōchi was the equivalent of the Greek term σοφία (sofia). Afterwards, the students had proposed that the school be known as Sophia University.

Fr. Hoffmann, SJ, who was serving as University President at that time, initially opposed the proposal. However, he soon accepted the idea and submitted the proposal to Rome for the approval.

The English language-based, peer-reviewed academic journal Monumenta Nipponica, which was first inaugurated in 1938, identified itself as being published by Sophia University. The use of Sophia as the university name then became firmly established in Japan and overseas.

History of the university

Early history 
The origins of Sophia University could be traced to 1549 when Saint Francis Xavier, a prominent member and co-founder of the Society of Jesus, arrived in Japan to spread Christianity. In his letters to his fellow Jesuits, he had expressed hopes of establishing a university in Japan.

During the so-called Kirishitan period of Japanese history, the Catholic Church had been responsible for establishing and administering educational institutions in Japan called Collegios and Seminarios, serving as bridges between the East and West. 

The establishment of the university only began to take place more than 400 years from St. Francis Xavier's arrival in Japan. In 1903, three Jesuit priests from Europe came to Japan to continue the missionary work of the Church and to help establish Sophia University. One of the founders, Fr. Joseph Dahlmann, SJ from Germany, who had come to Japan via India, had listened to the requests of Catholics in the country, who expressed their desires to construct a Catholic university to serve as the cultural and spiritual base of the Church's missionary operations in Japan.

Dahlmann heeded the requests and sent a proposal to the then-Bishop of Rome, Pope Pius X, at the Holy See in Rome. In 1905, Dahlmann was granted a private audience with the Pope, who promised to assign the Society of Jesus to create and administer a Catholic university in Japan. In Dahlmann's Latin memoirs regarding the encounter with Pius, he recounted that he spoke as follows: "Habebitis collegium in Japonica, magnam universitatem (in English: "You (plural) will have in Japan a college that is a great university".).

On that same year, the then-Bishop of Portland, Maine in the United States, William H. O'Connell, was appointed by the Pope to serve as a special ambassador of the Vatican to Emperor Meiji in Japan. O'Connell was also tasked to survey the situation in Japan. When he was granted an audience with Emperor Meiji, he had ascertained the education policy directions of the Japanese Ministry of Education, and reported to officials at the Holy See regarding the possible establishment of a Catholic university in Japan.

At the 25th General Congregation of the Society of Jesus in held in Rome in September 1906, Pius X issued a formal written statement to the Jesuits to establish a Catholic university in Japan. Thus, the delegates at the Congregation voted unanimously in favour of the Pope's commands, and the first concrete steps were taken to prepare a university institution in the East.

History of the university after its establishment 

Sophia University was founded by Jesuits in 1913. It opened with departments of German Literature, Philosophy and Commerce, headed by its founder Fr. Hermann Hoffmann, SJ (1864–1937) as its first official president.

In 1932, a small group of Sophia University students refused to salute the war dead at Yasukuni Shrine in the presence of a Japanese military attache, saying it violated their religious beliefs. The military attache was withdrawn from Sophia as a result of this incident, damaging the university's reputation in the eyes of the government of the Japanese Empire. The Archbishop of Tokyo intervened in the standoff by permitting Catholic students to salute the war dead, after which many Sophia students, as well as Hermann Hoffmann himself, participated in rites at Yasukuni. The Congregation for the Evangelization of Peoples later issued the Pluries Instanterque in 1936, which encouraged Catholics to attend Shinto shrines as a patriotic gesture; the Vatican re-issued this document after the war in 1951.

Sophia University continued to grow as it increased the number of academic departments, faculty members and students, in addition to advancing its international focus by establishing an exchange program. Many of its students studied at Georgetown University in the United States as early as 1935. Sophia's junior college was established in 1973, followed by the opening of Sophia Community College in 1976. With the founding of the Faculty of Liberal Arts in 2006, Sophia University presently holds 27 departments in its eight faculties. Its current president is Yoshiaki Terumichi. Toshiaki Koso serves as head of its board of directors. Since 2008, the Global Leadership Program was started for students from four Jesuit universities in East Asia: Ateneo de Manila University in the Philippines, Fu Jen Catholic University in Taiwan, Sogang University in South Korea, and Sophia University in Japan. In 2016 the university reached out to the four Jesuit junior-senior high schools in Japan, joining them in the Sophia College Corporation to help them pass on the Jesuit charism to their lay faculty through workshops and other assistance. These schools are  Sophia-Fukuoka, Eiko Gakuen, Hiroshima Gakuin, and Rokko School.

Campuses 

Sophia's main campus at Yotsuya is urban, consisting of roughly 25 large, modern buildings in the center of Tokyo. The majority of Sophia's 10,000 undergraduate students spend nearly all their time here. The faculties of Humanities, Law, Foreign Studies, Economics, Liberal Arts, and Science and Technology have their home here, as do the main library, cafeteria, gymnasium, chapel, bookstore, and offices. In April 2006, the Faculty of Comparative Culture, which had been located at the smaller  Ichigaya campus, moved to the main Yotsuya campus and changed its name to the Faculty of Liberal Arts. Nearly all of Sophia's foreign exchange and international students study at the FLA.

The Tokyo office of the Council on International Educational Exchange, the student exchange organisation, which oversees roughly half of the international students, is also based on the main Yotsuya Campus. The Shakujii (Tokyo) campus houses the Faculty of Theology. The Hadano campus in Kanagawa Prefecture is home to the Sophia Junior College, as well as a number of seminar halls and athletics complexes.

List of campuses 
 Yotsuya Campus (Chiyoda Ward, Tokyo Prefecture)
 Mejiro Seibo Campus (Shinjuku Ward, Tokyo Prefecture)
 Shakuji Campus (Nerima Ward, Tokyo Prefecture)
 Hadano Campus (Hadano City, Kanagawa Prefecture)
 Osaka Satellite Campus (Osaka City, Osaka Prefecture)

International cooperation 
Sophia University has international partnership agreements with 396 institutions in 81 countries. Some of Sophia's partner universities include Georgetown University, Yale University, University of Hong Kong, and LMU Munich. It also maintains nine overseas bases serving as liaisons between the Sophia School Corporation and overseas localities. 

 Luxembourg Office (ルクセンブルクオフィス)
 ASEAN Hub Centre in Bangkok (ASEANハブセンター)
 China Liaison Offices in Beijing and Shanghai (中国連絡処)
 Cologne Office (ケルンオフィス)
 Los Angeles Office (ロスアンゼルスオフィス)
 New York Office (ニューヨークオフィス）

Sophia School Corporation 
Established in 1911, the Sophia School Corporation (学校法人上智学院, Gakko Hojin Jochi Gakuin) is a public interest corporation established under the Private School Act (Act no. 270 of 1945) for the purpose of establishing a private school. The Sophia School Corporation serves as the operator of Sophia University and other Jesuit-affiliated schools in Japan, managing a total of seven schools. It was established in 1951.

Academics 
The university has nine undergraduate faculties with 29 departments as well as 10 graduate schools with 25 programmes. With over 14,021 students as of 2017, the university provides academic opportunities for students from Japan and overseas to study in Japan. Sophia also possesses a wide-variety of English-taught academic programmes such as those provided by the Faculty of Liberal Arts (FLA). English programmes are also provided by the Faculty of Science and Technology (FST) through two programmes and the Green Science Program, provided by the Department of Materials and Life Sciences, and the Green Engineering Program, provided by the Department of Engineering and Applied Sciences.

Undergraduate faculties and programmes 
 Faculty of Liberal Arts
 Sophia Program for Sustainable Futures
 Faculty of Economics
 Faculty of Science and Technology
 Faculty of Foreign Studies
 Faculty of Law
 Faculty of Human Sciences
 Faculty of Global Studies
 Faculty of Theology
 Faculty of Humanities

Academic programmes taught in English 
In addition to most courses of study taught almost entirely in Japanese, Sophia has a variety of academic programmes and courses taught in English. The Faculty of Liberal Arts (FLA), the Green Science and Engineering courses in the Faculty of Science and Technology (FST), and the Sophia Program for Sustainable Futures (SPSF).

Courses taught in the Faculty of Liberal Arts 
 International Business and Economics (IBE)
 Comparative Culture
 Social Studies

English courses taught in the Faculty of Science and Technology 
 Green Science programme (offered by the Department of Materials and Life Sciences)
 Green Engineering programme (offered by the Department of Engineering and Applied Sciences)

Courses taught in the Sophia Program for Sustainable Futures

Graduate schools and programmes 
 Graduate School of Science and Technology
 Graduate School of Global Environmental Studies
 Graduate School of Economics
 Graduate School of Human Sciences
 Graduate School of Law
 Graduate School of Theology
 Graduate School of Applied Religious Studies
 Graduate School of Humanities
 Graduate School of Global Studies
 Graduate School of Languages and Linguistics

University academic research 
Sophia University is a comprehensive research university with 9 undergraduate faculties with 10 graduate schools located on a single campus in Chiyoda, Tokyo. Leading higher education institutions in Japan toward globalisation and academic research, the university provides a strong international network of scholarship, attracting researchers and students from overseas to study in Japan.

As a research institution, the university established the Sophia Research Organisation (SRO) in April 2005 in order to promote and facilitate interdisciplinary and organisational research activities. The SRO possesses two research divisions: the Research Institutes Division and the Project Research Division. The university also has affiliated Research Organisations.

Simultaneously, Sophia's Centre for Research Promotion and Support provides additional support to general research activities and strengthens the a three-way collaboration initiative among industries, government, and academia. The Intellectual Property Rights Committee, established in 2005, ensures smooth collaborative support among the three individual groups and examines the inventions and intellectual properties of the researchers affiliated with Sophia University.

To assist with academic research and learning, Sophia currently has a total of 3 libraries and an affiliated library, possessing in total more than 11.5 million books and 12,570 journal titles.

Sophia University libraries 
 Sophia University Central Library（上智大学中央図書館）
 Law School Library（法科大学院図書室）
 Mejiro Seibo Campus Library（目白聖母キャンパス図書室）

Affiliated library 
 Kirishitan Bunko Library（キリシタン文庫）

Student life

Student housing and dormitories 
Sophia University has student housing options and dormitories scattered throughout Tokyo. These university dormitories provide facilities and spaces for students to undertake study and research activities. Events and various programmes are also organised by students and housing staff for the benefit of the housing community all year round.

List of Student Dormitories:
 Sophia Soshigaya International House (Male/Female)
 Sophia-Arrupe International Residence (Male/Female
 Sophia Edogawa Men's Dormitory (Male)

Sophia University has a group of designated and recommended dormitories, which are owned and operated by various private housing companies.

List of Designated Dormitories Owned by Private Companies:

 Sophia Higashi Nakano Dormitory (Female) (Nakano Ward, Tokyo)
 Sophia Kasai International House (Female) (Edogawa Ward, Tokyo)
 Student House Luxlass (Male/Female) (Shinjuku Ward, Tokyo)

Academic rankings

There are several rankings below related to Sophia University.

University rankings

Japanese university rankings 
According to the Times Higher Education 2021 Japan University Rankings, Sophia University is ranked 18th in the nation. Sophia is the fourth largest liberal arts university in the country.

Global/regional university rankings 
According to the 2021 QS World University Rankings, Sophia University is ranked 801–1000. In the 2021 QS rankings, Sophia was 181st in Asia and the 28th in Japan.  Its 2021 Times Higher Education Impact Ranking, which assesses universities against the United Nations Sustainable Development Goals (UN SDGs), is 601–800.

Alumni rankings
Alumni of Sophia have good employment prospects in Japanese industries. According to the Weekly Economist's 2010 rankings and the PRESIDENT's article on 2006/10/16, graduates from Sophia have the eighth best employment rate in 400 major companies, and the average graduate salary is the sixth best in Japan.

Popularity and selectivity
Admission to Sophia is highly selective and competitive. As such it is considered one of the top private universities along with Keio University and Waseda University. Typical acceptance rate is 5%. Its entrance difficulty is considered one of the toughest along with  Waseda and Keio among 730 private universities.

Overseas partner institutions 
Sophia University has student and academic exchange agreements with 387 overseas partner universities in 81 countries and regions as of June 2021.

List of External University Agreements and Affiliations:

 Association of Southeast and East Asian Catholic Colleges and Universities (ASEACCU)
 Comprehensive Agreement on Cooperation with Kwansei Gakuin University
 Global 5 University Collaboration Agreement (with Waseda University, Akita International University, International Christian University, Ritsumeikan Asia Pacific University)
 Comprehensive Agreement on Cooperation with International Christian University
 Member of the Catholic University Institute for Christian Culture

Notable faculty
 Father Peter Milward, SJ, emeritus professor of English Literature
 Gregory Clark, former professor of economics; currently a Japan Times contributor
 Kuniko Inoguchi, former professor of law, and Permanent Representative of Japan to the Conference on Disarmament in Geneva
 Jun-ichi Nishizawa, electronic engineer, inventor and specially-appointed professor; 
 Sadako Ogata, former professor of political science, and former United Nations High Commissioner for Refugees; currently serving as President of the Japan International Cooperation Agency

Notable alumni

Politics 
 Morihiro Hosokawa, 79th Prime Minister of Japan
 Toshitsugu Saito, 65th and 66th Japanese Defence Minister
 Koichiro Genba, former Japanese Foreign Minister
 Seiko Noda, former Minister-in-charge of Measures against Declining Birthrate
 Kuniko Inoguchi, Japan's first Minister of State for Gender Equality and Social Affairs
 Takuya Hirai, former Minister for Digital Transformation
 Carlos Holmes Trujilo, former Foreign Minister and Defence Minister of Colombia
 Rizal Ramli, former Finance Minister of Indonesia
 Yukari Sato, economist and LDP Member of the House of Representatives
 Shoichi Kondo, DPJ Member of the House of Representatives and former Senior Vice Minister for the Environment
 Li Linsi, Chinese diplomat, educator, diplomatic consultant to Chiang Kai-shek
 Mukhriz Mahathir, 11th Menteri Besar of Kedah, Malaysia
 Benigno Aquino III, 15th President of the Philippines

Academia 
Ruben Habito, associate professor at Southern Methodist University
 Yuya Kiuchi, sport and pop culture scholar at Michigan State University
Fidel Nemenzo, mathematician, chancellor of University of the Philippines Diliman
Junko Shigemitsu, theoretical physicist, emerita professor at Ohio State University
Kyouichi Tachikawa, historian
Takayuki Tatsumi, American literature scholar at Keio University
Dominique Turpin, Dean & President of IMD, Switzerland
Shōichi Watanabe, English scholar

Business 
Hassan Jameel, President and Vice Chairman of Abdul Latif Jameel
Johnny Kitagawa, founder and CEO of Johnny & Associates
Shawn Layden,  President & CEO of Sony Interactive Entertainment America
Peer Schneider, co-founder and SVP/Publisher at IGN Entertainment
Shuzo Shiota, CEO and president of Polygon Pictures

Media and literature
Jake Adelstein, journalist, consultant, and author of Tokyo Vice
Beni Arashiro, singer
Yoshitaka Asama, screenwriter and film director 
Vernon Grant, first American cartoonist to introduce manga concepts to English-language readers
Boyé Lafayette De Mente, author on Japanese culture ('54)
Desiree Lim, Malaysian-born Canadian independent film director, producer, and screenwriter
Kōichi Mashimo, anime director, founder of studio Bee Train
Yuriko Nishiyama, manga writer, including Harlem Beat
Maureen Wartski, author, including A Boat to Nowhere and Yuri's Brush with Magic
Robert Whiting, author on Japanese culture, including The Chrysanthemum and the Bat and You Gotta Have Wa about Japanese baseball
Yūki Yamato, Japanese screenwriter and director
Tadatoshi Fujimaki, Manga artist and creator of Kuroko's Basketball

Others
Agnes Chan, singer and ambassador of the Japan Committee for UNICEF
Kurara Chibana, Miss Japan 2006 and first Runner-up at Miss Universe 2006
Tina Chow, model and jewellery designer
Bruce Frantzis, Taoist Master, USA
Yū Hayami, actress, singer
Sumire Uesaka, anime voice actress
Carrie Ann Inaba, American dancer, choreographer, actress, and singer
Hisashi Inoue, author
Maiko Itai, Miss Universe Japan 2010 winner
Crystal Kay, singer
Stephen Kim Sou-hwan, Korean Roman Catholic cardinal and Archbishop of Seoul
Peter Shirayanagi, Japanese Roman Catholic cardinal and Archbishop of Tokyo
Saori Kumi, author
Alan Merrill, a 1960s Group Sounds pioneer gaijin tarento and later composer of the classic song "I Love Rock N Roll"
Osamu Mizutani, high school teacher, famous for his book "Yomawari Sensei" and his efforts to redress delinquents
Father Adolfo Nicolás, S.J., Superior General of the Society of Jesus
Hikaru Nishida, actress, Japanese drama
Judy Ongg, singer/actor
Zomahoun Idossou Rufin, a gaijin tarento, philanthropist and diplomat who has been Benin's Ambassador to Japan and the Philippines
Emyli, singer
George Takei, Japanese-American actor most famous for his role as Star Trek's Mr. Sulu
Tadashi Yamamoto, Founder of the Japan Center for International Exchange and the Shimoda Conference
Michelle van Eimeren, Miss Universe Australia 1994

See also
 Education in Japan
Catholic Education
Japanese Educational System
History of the Catholic Church in Japan
List of Jesuit sites
Society of Jesus (Jesuits) in Japan
Catholic Church in Japan
Christianity in Japan
List of Jesuit Educational Institutions

References

External links 

 Sophia University Homepage 
 Sophia University Homepage 
 Sophia University Old Homepage 
 Sophia University Faculty of Liberal Arts (FLA) Homepage (English only)
Sophia University Faculty of Economics Homepage (Japanese and English)
Sophia University Graduate School of Global Studies (Japanese and English)
Sophia University Faculty/Graduate School of Science and Technology (Japanese and English)

 
1913 establishments in Japan
Christianity in Tokyo
Educational institutions established in 1913
Jesuit universities and colleges
Private universities and colleges in Japan
Catholic universities and colleges in Japan
Association of Christian Universities and Colleges in Asia
Universities and colleges in Tokyo